The Strangeland Tour was the fifth tour performed by the British Band Keane, to support the launch of their fourth studio album Strangeland.

Opening acts

Mystery Jets (North America—Leg 1)
Youngblood Hawke (North America—Leg 2)
Wolf Gang (Europe—Leg 2, select dates)
Zulu Winter (Europe—Leg 2, select dates)
Hoodlums (Bexhill-on-Sea)
Hays (Saint Petersburg)
Bastille (Paris—15 May 2012)
Patrick Wilson (Chicago)
Kiev (Denver, Salt Lake City, Los Angeles—29 June 2012)
IIRIS (Helsinki, Salacgrīva)
Civil Twilight (Vancouver)
AGOP (Paris—17 October 2012)
Miss Caffeina (Madrid)
Kieran Leonard (Nottingham)
Space Bee (Lima)
We Are The Grand (Santiago—8 April 2013)
Rayos Laser (Buenos Aires)
Pablo López (Calella de Palafrugell)
Laura Mvula (London—25 August 2013)
Jessica Sweetman (London—25 August 2013)

Setlist

Tour dates

Festivals and other miscellaneous performances

South by Southwest
Pinkpop Festival
Rock im Park
Rock am Ring
Hastings Beer and Music Festival
T in the Park
Bilbao BBK Live
Cascais Festival
Positivus Festival
Pukkelpop
V Festival
Bumbershoot
Lollapalooza
Sandance
Norwegian Wood
NorthSide Festival
Indian Summer Festival
Cornbury Festival
TW Classic
Santander Music Festival
Expofacic
Festival de Cap Roig
Adnams Newmarket Night
AIA Summer Party
CarFest South
Kenwood's Outdoor Summer Concerts

Cancellations and rescheduled shows

Box office score data

Personnel
Band
 Tom Chaplin – lead vocals, electric guitar, acoustic guitar, synths.
 Tim Rice-Oxley – piano, synths, backing vocals
 Richard Hughes – drums, percussion, synths ("You Haven't Told Me Anything"), backing vocals
 Jesse Quin – bass guitar, synths, electric guitar, percussion, backing vocals

Crew
Lighting Company: Lite Alternative (UK)/Upstaging (US)
Lighting & Set Designer: Rob Sinclair
Lighting Director: Matt Arthur
Lighting Technicians: Mike Sheppard, Rob Starksfield (UK), Mike Ponsiglioni (US)
Tour & Production Manager: Colin Davies
Stage/Set Company: Hangman Ltd.
Trucking Company: Fly By Night (UK)/Upstaging (US)
Source:

References

2012 concert tours
2013 concert tours
Keane (band) concert tours